Vesuvio Entertainment, founded by industry veteran Greg H. Sims, is known for producing high-end indie films, distributing a wide variety of genre movies, and managing artists in film, TV, and music. The company focuses on a synergy of film and music, which takes on a variety of forms.

Its growing film library includes such disparate titles as the early, critically acclaimed George Clooney film Red Surf, which is actually where Quentin Tarantino eyed him for From Dusk Till Dawn; Touch Me, which was an Official Selection at the Toronto International Film Festival, and stars Amanda Peet, Michael Vartan, Peter Facinelli, Greg Louganis, and Jane Lynch; and their more recent title, Behind Your Eyes, an award-winning film that became the #2 best renting genre DVD in the US. The company was also involved in the international distribution of Craigslist Joe, from Executive Producer Zach Galifianakis. They have also just announced U.S. distribution for An Open Secret, by Academy Award nominated director, Amy Berg. On the management side, they represent legacy artist, Martha Davis and The Motels, as well as the up-and-coming indie band, Parlee.

They also have a couple of recently announced projects, including Martha Davis and The Motels, Live at the 50th Anniversary of the Whisky A Go Go, which was filmed by two-time Emmy Award winner Roy H. Wagner, and directed by Denise Faye, who choreographed much of the Dressed to Kill Tour (Cher), The American Music Awards, Dancing with the Stars, and The X Factor UK. And, in development, they have All Six Feet, the very personal, true story of Lana Clarkson and her best friend, Punkin' Pie, and the events leading up to the Phil Spector trial.

References

Film distributors of the United States
Film production companies of the United States